Camera is a genus of wasp in the family Corydiidae and are parasitoid on the eggs of wall crab spiders (Selenopidae).

References 

Hymenoptera genera
Insects described in 1962
Cryptinae